Toni Kallela (born January 10, 1993) is a Finnish professional ice hockey Right Wing. He is currently playing with Skellefteå AIK in the Swedish SHL.

Kallela made his SM-liiga debut playing with KalPa during the 2011–12 SM-liiga season. On May 20, 2013, Kallela returned from a short stint in the Swedish HockeyAllsvenskan with Mora IK, to the Finnish Liiga in signing a two-year contract with Tappara.

References

External links

1993 births
Living people
Finnish ice hockey right wingers
KalPa players
Mora IK players
SaPKo players
Tappara players
People from Oulainen
Sportspeople from North Ostrobothnia